People Are Strange is a studio album by Swedish singer-songwriter Stina Nordenstam. It was originally released on EastWest Records in 1998.

Track listing

References

External links
 

1998 albums
Stina Nordenstam albums
Covers albums
East West Records albums